The Central District of Mohr County is a district (bakhsh) in Mohr County, Fars Province, Iran. At the 2006 census, its population was 13,265, in 2,738 families.  The District has one city: Mohr. The District has two rural districts (dehestan): Arudan Rural District and Mohr Rural District.

References 

Mohr County
Districts of Fars Province